Stephen Paul Kelly (born 30 December 1961) is a British businessman, and the former chief executive officer of Sage Group.

Early life
He was born in Kent, England and attended the Harvey Grammar School in Folkestone. Kelly received a BSc in Business Administration from the University of Bath. He went on to receive an honorary doctorate in Business (2016).

Career
Kelly has 35 years' leadership experience in both the private and public sectors. He has held CEO positions with three UK & US public tech companies, as well as spending three years as COO of the UK Government. Under his CEO stewardship, the companies increased their combined market value by approximately $10bn.

He started his career in Technical Support, working for the now-defunct British tech firm, ICL, for four years. In 1988, he joined American multinational computer technology corporation, Oracle as an executive of the European management team. After nine years at Oracle, he joined Californian enterprise software start-up, Chordiant which become a Fintech Unicorn at IPO on Nasdaq. In 2001 he became chief executive officer, replacing Sam Spadafora. Kelly attended and completed Stanford University Directors’ College - best in class company governance, control environment and integrity.

He returned to the UK in 2006 to become chief executive officer of FTSE software firm Micro Focus International. In 2009, he announced he would step down as CEO of Micro Focus, citing personal reasons. Micro Focus was one of the FTSE250 best performing stocks during his tenure, rising seven-fold.

In 2011 he joined the UK Government, and was made chief operating officer and head of the Efficiency and Reform Group in 2012 under cabinet office minister, Francis Maude. During the coalition years, the Efficiency & Reform program delivered £50bn of savings and Stephen was commended by Margaret Hodge, chair of PAC. Flagship programs including the digitisation with Gov.UK won multiple awards. Prime Minister David Cameron hailed the Government Digital Service (GDS) as “one of the great unsung triumphs of the last parliament” in a speech (Friday 11 September 2015). In 2016, the UK was recognised by the UN and the world’s best digital Government. Kelly joined the Cabinet Office Board amongst many Government Board roles and chaired the Government’s Senior Information, Security & Risk Board.

He left his role with the Government in November 2014 to join FTSE 100 multinational enterprise software company, Sage Group, where he was Sage's first externally appointed CEO. During his time as CEO, Sage's market value doubled to £8bn and the firm acquired North American cloud-based financial software company Intacct in 2017 for $850m, and Fairsail, a British provider of cloud-based human resources software. Sage cloud revenues grew from £2m in 2014 to £486m of annualised recurring revenues in 2018. Sage won innovation awards and launched the first AI and chatbot in the market. As part of the compassionate capitalism & social purpose mission, Kelly started the Sage Foundation, donating annually 75,000 days of volunteering time, technology & millions of pounds to philanthropic and charitable causes. Notable successes includes dramatically reducing youth homelessness in Newcastle and positively impacting domestic violence in South Africa. 
Kelly co-Chaired the Anglo-Brazil Trade Board (JETCO). 

In 2015, Kelly was appointed as one of six new Prime Minister's business ambassadors to help boost the UK's performance in international trade.

On 31 August 2018, Sage Group announced that Kelly would step down as a director and CEO and he was succeeded by Steve Hare, CFO during Kelly's tenure at the company.

On 1 June 2020, Kelly was appointed as Chair of Tech Nation, the growth platform for tech companies and leaders, joining existing board members including Tech Nation CEO Gerard Grech, David James Richards, founder and CEO of WANdisco, and Sarah Wood, co-founder of Unruly and Jo Johnson, Lesley Eccles& Eric Collins He is an angel investor & mentor in many sustainability and women-led businesses as well as Chair of The Algorithm People. He was appointed Chair of the Science & Technology Honours Committee in December 2021. Stephen was voted ‘Mentor of the year at UK Enterprise Awards (2019)’. Also, he was invited to the No. 10 Innovation Fellowship Board in 2021.

Personal life
He is married with three daughters.

References

External links 
 

21st-century English businesspeople
Alumni of the University of Bath
English chief executives
1961 births
Living people
Sage Group people